Jonathan Alan Smith is a psychologist currently based at Birkbeck, University of London. He has been very prominent in promoting qualitative research within social psychology and health psychology. In particular, he has developed and promoted a particular approach known as interpretative phenomenological analysis (IPA).

Smith achieved a DPhil in Psychology from the University of Oxford and then held lectureships at Keele and Sheffield Universities. He has at least 160 publications to his name.

Awards and Distinctions
 Honorary Fellow, British Psychological Society
 Fellow, Academy of Social Sciences

Works
 Smith, J.A. (2003) (ed) Qualitative Psychology: A Practical Guide to Research Methods. London: Sage.
 Smith, J., Flowers, P. & Larkin, M. (2009) Interpretative Phenomenological Analysis: Theory, Method and Research. London: SAGE.

See also
 Phenomenological psychology
 Qualitative psychological research

References

Year of birth missing (living people)
Living people
Academics of Birkbeck, University of London
English psychologists
British psychologists